Amanita armeniaca is a species of agaric fungus in the family Amanitaceae native to Australia.

References

External links

armeniaca
Fungi native to Australia
Fungi described in 1997